Lac de Vonnes is an artificial lake at Châtel in Haute-Savoie, France.

Vonnes, Lac